The Battle of the Bridge or the Battle of al-Jisr was a battle at the bank of the Euphrates river between Arabs led by Abu Ubaid al-Thaqafi, and the Persian Sasanian forces led by Bahman Jaduya. It is traditionally dated to the year 634, and was the only major Sassanian victory over the Rashidun Caliphate army.

Context
The Muslim forces had already taken Hira and assumed control of the surrounding Arab-inhabited areas of Mesopotamia, on the banks of the Euphrates. The fall of Hira shocked the Persians, as the "youthful Yazdgard, began to take the business of the Arabs more seriously." Yazdgard sent forces to the Arab border areas, and looked to be gaining the upper hand, as Al-Muthanna had to call for reinforcements from Medina.

The new Caliph, Umar, sent Abu Ubaid to Mesopotamia to take command from Al-Muthanna. He encountered the main Persian force under Bahman Jaduya, near what is the present site of Kufa. The two forces faced each other on opposing banks of the Euphrates. As it was crossed by a bridge, the battle came to known as the Battle of the Bridge.

Battle
Bahman invited Abu Ubayd to decide who should cross the river. The latter took the initiative, and crossed the river aggressively; this proved to be disastrous. According to accounts, the sight of the elephants in the Persian army frightened the Arabs' horses. A white elephant apparently tore Abu Ubaid from his horse with its trunk and trampled him underfoot during his misguided attempt to attack its trunk. At this, and the inability of the Arab troops to push back the Persians who had formed a rigid line close to the bridge, the Arabs panicked and fled. After Abu Ubayd the command was taken by al-Hakam and Jabr, his brother and son, respectively, and eventually Al-Muthanna. According to tradition, Al-Muthanna remained to fight so that the Arabs could repair the bridge and flee losing 4,000 men, although any accurate estimates of the figures involved in this and other contemporaneous battles are not known. Around 3,000 Arab Muslims were carried away by the river.

Sources agree that for whatever reason, Bahman Jaduya did not pursue the fleeing Arab army.

See also
Muslim conquest of Persia
Fall of the Sasanian Empire
Battle of al-Qādisiyyah

References

Sources

Battles involving the Rashidun Caliphate
Battles involving the Sasanian Empire
Muslim conquest of Mesopotamia
634